

Events

Pre-1600
 681 – Twelfth Council of Toledo: King Erwig of the Visigoths initiates a council in which he implements diverse measures against the Jews in Spain.
1127 – Jin–Song Wars: Invading Jurchen soldiers from the Jin dynasty besiege and sack Bianjing (Kaifeng), the capital of the Song dynasty of China, and abduct Emperor Qinzong of Song and others, ending the Northern Song dynasty.
1349 – The Jewish population of Basel, believed by the residents to be the cause of the ongoing Black Death, is rounded up and incinerated.
1431 – The trial of Joan of Arc begins in Rouen.
1693 – 1693 Sicily earthquake: The first of two earthquakes destroys parts of Sicily and Malta. After the second quake on 11 January, the death toll is estimated at between 60,000 and 100,000 people.

1601–1900
1760 – Ahmad Shah Durrani defeats the Marathas in the Battle of Barari Ghat.
1787 – The nationally known image of the Black Nazarene in the Philippines was transferred from what is now Rizal Park to its present shrine in the minor basilica of Quiapo Church. This is annually commemorated through its Traslación (solemn transfer) in the streets of Manila and is attended by millions of devotees.
1788 – Connecticut becomes the fifth state to ratify the United States Constitution.
1792 – Treaty of Jassy between Russian and Ottoman Empire is signed, ending the Russo-Turkish War of 1787–92.
1793 – Jean-Pierre Blanchard becomes the first person to fly in a balloon in the United States.
1799 – British Prime Minister William Pitt the Younger introduces an income tax of two shillings to the pound to raise funds for Great Britain's war effort in the Napoleonic Wars.
1806 – Admiral Horatio Lord Nelson receives a state funeral and is interred in St Paul's Cathedral.
1816 – Humphry Davy tests his safety lamp for miners at Hebburn Colliery.
1822 – The Portuguese prince Pedro I of Brazil decides to stay in Brazil against the orders of the Portuguese King João VI, beginning the Brazilian independence process.
1839 – The French Academy of Sciences announces the Daguerreotype photography process.
1857 – The 7.9  Fort Tejon earthquake shakes Central and Southern California with a maximum Mercalli intensity of IX (Violent).
1858 – British forces finally defeat Rajab Ali Khan of Chittagong
1861 – American Civil War: "Star of the West" incident occurs near Charleston, South Carolina. 
  1861   – Mississippi becomes the second state to secede from the Union before the outbreak of the American Civil War.
1878 – Umberto I becomes King of Italy.

1901–present
1903 – Hallam Tennyson, 2nd Baron Tennyson, son of the poet Alfred Tennyson, becomes the second Governor-General of Australia.
1909 – Ernest Shackleton, leading the Nimrod Expedition to the South Pole, plants the British flag  from the South Pole, the farthest anyone had ever reached at that time.
1914 – The Phi Beta Sigma fraternity is founded by African-American students at Howard University in Washington D.C., United States.
1916 – World War I: The Battle of Gallipoli concludes with an Ottoman Empire victory when the last Allied forces are evacuated from the peninsula.
1917 – World War I: The Battle of Rafa is fought near the Egyptian border with Palestine.
1918 – Battle of Bear Valley: The last battle of the American Indian Wars.
1920 – Ukrainian War of Independence: The All-Ukrainian Central Executive Committee outlaws the Makhnovshchina by decree, igniting the Bolshevik–Makhnovist conflict.
1921 – Greco-Turkish War: The First Battle of İnönü, the first battle of the war, begins near Eskişehir in Anatolia.
1923 – Juan de la Cierva makes the first autogyro flight.
  1923   – Lithuanian residents of the Memel Territory rebel against the League of Nations' decision to leave the area as a mandated region under French control.
1927 – A fire at the Laurier Palace movie theatre in Montreal, Quebec, Canada, kills 78 children.
1941 – World War II: First flight of the Avro Lancaster.
1945 – World War II: The Sixth United States Army begins the invasion of Lingayen Gulf.
1957 – British Prime Minister Sir Anthony Eden resigns from office following his failure to retake the Suez Canal from Egyptian sovereignty.
1959 – The Vega de Tera dam fails, triggering a disastrous flood that nearly destroys the town of Ribadelago and kills 144 residents.
1960 – President of Egypt Gamal Abdel Nasser opens construction on the Aswan Dam by detonating ten tons of dynamite to demolish twenty tons of granite on the east bank of the Nile.
1961 – British authorities announce they have uncovered the Soviet Portland Spy Ring in London.
1962 – Apollo program: NASA announces plans to build the C-5 rocket launch vehicle, then known as the "Advanced Saturn", to carry human beings to the Moon.
1964 – Martyrs' Day: Several Panamanian youths try to raise the Panamanian flag in the U.S.-controlled Panama Canal Zone, leading to fighting between U.S. military and Panamanian civilians.
1991 – Representatives from the United States and Iraq meet at the Geneva Peace Conference to try to find a peaceful resolution to the Iraqi invasion of Kuwait.
1992 – The Assembly of the Serb People in Bosnia and Herzegovina proclaims the creation of Republika Srpska, a new state within Yugoslavia.
  1992   – The first discoveries of extrasolar planets are announced by astronomers Aleksander Wolszczan and Dale Frail. They discovered two planets orbiting the pulsar PSR 1257+12.
1996 – First Chechen War: Chechen separatists launch a raid against the helicopter airfield and later a civilian hospital in the city of Kizlyar in the neighboring Dagestan, which turns into a massive hostage crisis involving thousands of civilians.
1997 – Comair Flight 3272 crashes in Raisinville Township in Monroe County, Michigan, killing 29 people.
2003 – TANS Perú Flight 222 crashes on approach to Chachapoyas Airport in Chachapoyas, Peru, killing 46 people.
2004 – An inflatable boat carrying illegal Albanian emigrants stalls near the Karaburun Peninsula en route to Brindisi, Italy; exposure to the elements kills 28. This is the second deadliest marine disaster in Albanian history.
2005 – Mahmoud Abbas wins the election to succeed Yasser Arafat as President of the Palestinian National Authority, replacing interim president Rawhi Fattouh.
  2005   – The Sudan People's Liberation Movement and the Government of Sudan sign the Comprehensive Peace Agreement to end the Second Sudanese Civil War.
2007 – Apple CEO Steve Jobs introduces the original iPhone at a Macworld keynote in San Francisco. 
2011 – Iran Air Flight 277 crashes near Urmia in the northwest of the country, in icy conditions, killing 77 people.
2014 – An explosion at a Mitsubishi Materials chemical plant in Yokkaichi, Japan, kills at least five people and injures 17 others.
2015 – The perpetrators of the Charlie Hebdo shooting in Paris two days earlier are both killed after a hostage situation; a second hostage situation, related to the Charlie Hebdo shooting, occurs at a Jewish market in Vincennes.
  2015   – A mass poisoning at a funeral in Mozambique involving beer that was contaminated with Burkholderia gladioli leaves 75 dead and over 230 people ill.
2021 – Sriwijaya Air Flight 182 crashes north of Jakarta, Indonesia, killing all 62 people on board.

Births

Pre-1600
727 – Emperor Daizong of Tang (d. 779)
1418 – Juan Ramón Folch III de Cardona, Aragonese admiral (d. 1485)
1554 – Pope Gregory XV (d. 1623)
1571 – Charles Bonaventure de Longueval, Count of Bucquoy, French commander (d. 1621)
1590 – Simon Vouet, French painter (d. 1649)

1601–1900
1606 – William Dugard, English printer (d. 1662)
1624 – Empress Meishō of Japan (d. 1696)
1645 – Sir William Villiers, 3rd Baronet, English noble and politician (date baptized; d. 1712)
1674 – Reinhard Keiser, German composer (d. 1739)
1685 – Tiberius Hemsterhuis, Dutch philologist and critic (d. 1766)
1728 – Thomas Warton, English poet, historian, and critic (d. 1790)
1735 – John Jervis, 1st Earl of St Vincent, English admiral and politician (d. 1823)
1745 – Caleb Strong, American lawyer and politician, 6th Governor of Massachusetts (d. 1819)
1753 – Luísa Todi, Portuguese soprano and actress (d. 1833)
1773 – Cassandra Austen, English painter and illustrator (d. 1845)
1778 – Hammamizade İsmail Dede Efendi, Turkish Ney player and composer (d. 1846)
1811 – Gilbert Abbott à Beckett, English journalist and author (d. 1856)
1818 – Antoine Samuel Adam-Salomon, French sculptor and photographer (d. 1881)
1819 – James Francis, English-Australian businessman and politician, 9th Premier of Victoria (d. 1884)
1822 – Carol Benesch, Czech-Romanian architect, designed the Peleș Castle (d. 1896)
1823 – Friedrich von Esmarch, German surgeon and academic (d. 1908)
1829 – Thomas William Robertson, English director and playwright (d. 1871)
  1829   – Adolf Schlagintweit, German botanist and explorer (d. 1857)
1832 – Félix-Gabriel Marchand, Canadian journalist and politician, 11th Premier of Quebec (d. 1900)
1839 – John Knowles Paine, American composer and academic (d. 1906)
1848 – Princess Frederica of Hanover (d. 1926)
1849 – John Hartley, English tennis player (d. 1935)
1854 – Jennie Jerome, American-born wife of Lord Randolph Churchill, mother of Sir Winston Churchill (d. 1921) 
1856 – Anton Aškerc, Slovenian priest and poet (d. 1912)
1859 – Carrie Chapman Catt, American activist, founded the League of Women Voters and International Alliance of Women (d. 1947)
1864 – Vladimir Steklov, Russian mathematician and physicist (d. 1926)
1868 – S. P. L. Sørensen, Danish chemist and academic (d. 1939)
1870 – Joseph Strauss, American engineer, co-designed the Golden Gate Bridge (d. 1938)
1873 – Hayim Nahman Bialik, Ukrainian-Austrian journalist, author, and poet (d. 1934)
  1873   – Thomas Curtis, American sprinter and hurdler (d. 1944)
  1873   – John Flanagan, Irish-American hammer thrower (d. 1938)
1875 – Gertrude Vanderbilt Whitney, American sculptor and art collector, founded the Whitney Museum of American Art (d. 1942)
1879 – John B. Watson, American psychologist and academic (d. 1958)
1881 – Lascelles Abercrombie, English poet and critic (d. 1938)
  1881   – Giovanni Papini, Italian journalist, author, and poet (d. 1956)
1885 – Charles Bacon, American runner and hurdler (d. 1968)
1886 – Lloyd Loar, American sound engineer and instrument designer (d. 1943)
1889 – Vrindavan Lal Verma, Indian author and playwright (d. 1969)
1890 – Karel Čapek, Czech author and playwright (d. 1938)
  1890   – Kurt Tucholsky, German-Swedish journalist and author (d. 1935)
1892 – Eva Bowring, American lawyer and politician (d. 1985)
1893 – Edwin Baker, Canadian soldier and educator, co-founded the Canadian National Institute for the Blind (d. 1968)
1896 – Warwick Braithwaite, New Zealand-English conductor and director (d. 1971)
1897 – Karl Löwith, German philosopher, author, and academic (d. 1973)
  1897   – Halyna Kuzmenko, Ukrainian teacher and anarchist revolutionary (d. 1978)
1898 – Gracie Fields, English actress and singer (d. 1979)
1899 – Harald Tammer, Estonian journalist and weightlifter (d. 1942)
1900 – Richard Halliburton, American journalist and author (d. 1939)

1901–present
1901 – Vilma Bánky, Hungarian-American actress (d. 1991)
1902 – Rudolf Bing, American impresario and businessman (d. 1997)
  1902   – Josemaría Escrivá, Spanish priest and saint, founded Opus Dei (d. 1975)
1908 – Simone de Beauvoir, French philosopher and author (d. 1986) 
1909 – Anthony Mamo, Maltese lawyer and politician, 1st President of Malta (d. 2008)
  1909   – Patrick Peyton, Irish-American priest, television personality, and activist (d. 1992)
1912 – Ralph Tubbs, English architect, designed the Dome of Discovery (d. 1996)
1913 – Richard Nixon, American commander, lawyer, and politician, 37th President of the United States (d. 1994)
1914 – Kenny Clarke, American jazz drummer and bandleader (d. 1985)
1915 – Anita Louise, American actress (d. 1970)
  1915   – Fernando Lamas, Argentinian-American actor, singer, and director (d. 1982)
1918 – Alma Ziegler, American baseball player and golfer (d. 2005)
1919 – William Morris Meredith, Jr., American poet and academic (d. 2007)
1920 – Clive Dunn, English actor (d. 2012)
  1920   – Hakim Said, Pakistani scholar and politician, 20th Governor of Sindh (d. 1998)
1921 – Ágnes Keleti, Hungarian Olympic gymnast 
1922 – Har Gobind Khorana, Indian-American biochemist and academic, Nobel laureate (d. 2011)
  1922   – Ahmed Sékou Touré, Guinean politician, 1st President of Guinea (d. 1984)
1924 – Sergei Parajanov, Georgian-Armenian director and screenwriter (d. 1990)
1925 – Len Quested, English footballer and manager (d. 2012)
  1925   – Lee Van Cleef, American actor (d. 1989)
1926 – Jean-Pierre Côté, Canadian lawyer and politician, 23rd Lieutenant Governor of Quebec (d. 2002)
1928 – Judith Krantz, American novelist (d. 2019)
  1928   – Domenico Modugno, Italian singer-songwriter, actor, and politician (d. 1994)
1929 – Brian Friel, Irish author, playwright, and director (d. 2015)
  1929   – Heiner Müller, German poet, playwright, and director (d. 1995)
1931 – Algis Budrys, Lithuanian-American author and critic (d. 2008)
1933 – Roy Dwight, English footballer (d. 2002)
  1933   – Wilbur Smith, Zambian-English journalist and author (d. 2021)
1934 – Bart Starr, American football player and coach (d. 2019)
1935 – Bob Denver, American actor (d. 2005)
  1935   – Dick Enberg, American sportscaster (d. 2017)
  1935   – John Graham, New Zealand rugby player and educator (d. 2017)
  1935   – Brian Harradine, Australian politician (d. 2014)
1936 – Marko Veselica, Croatian academic and politician (d. 2017)
1938 – Claudette Boyer, Canadian educator and politician (d. 2013)
1939 – Susannah York, English actress and activist (d. 2011)
1940 – Barbara Buczek, Polish composer (d. 1993)
  1940   – Ruth Dreifuss, Swiss journalist and politician, 86th President of the Swiss Confederation
1941 – Joan Baez, American singer-songwriter, guitarist and activist
1943 – Robert Drewe, Australian author and playwright
  1943   – Elmer MacFadyen, Canadian lawyer and politician (d. 2007)
  1943   – Scott Walker, American singer-songwriter, bass player, and producer (d. 2019)
1944 – Harun Farocki, German filmmaker (d. 2014)
  1944   – Jimmy Page, English guitarist, songwriter, and producer
  1944   – Mihalis Violaris, Cypriot singer-songwriter and actor
1945 – Levon Ter-Petrosyan, Syrian-Armenian scholar and politician, 1st President of Armenia
1946 – Mohammad Ishaq Khan, Indian historian and academic (d. 2013)
  1946   – Mogens Lykketoft, Danish politician, 45th Danish Minister of Foreign Affairs
1948 – Bill Cowsill, American singer-songwriter and guitarist (d. 2006)
  1948   – Jan Tomaszewski, Polish footballer, manager, and politician
1950 – Alec Jeffreys, English geneticist and academic
1951 – Crystal Gayle, American singer-songwriter and producer 
1952 – Kaushik Basu, Indian economist and academic
1954 – Philippa Gregory, Kenyan-English author and academic
1955 – J. K. Simmons, American actor
1956 – Waltraud Meier, German soprano and actress
  1956   – Imelda Staunton, English actress and singer
1957 – Phil Lewis, English musician, singer and songwriter
1959 – Rigoberta Menchú, Guatemalan activist and politician, Nobel Prize laureate
1960 – Lisa Walters, Canadian golfer
1961 – Didier Camberabero, French rugby player
1962 – Ray Houghton, Scottish-born footballer 
1963 – Irwin McLean, Northern Irish biologist and academic
1965 – Muggsy Bogues, American basketball player
  1965   – Haddaway, Trinidadian-German singer and musician
  1965   – Joely Richardson, English actress
1967 – Matt Bevin, American politician, 62nd Governor of Kentucky
  1967   – Claudio Caniggia, Argentinian footballer
  1967   – Dave Matthews, South African-American singer-songwriter, guitarist, and actor
1968 – Jimmy Adams, Jamaican cricketer and coach
  1968   – Joey Lauren Adams, American actress
  1968   – Giorgos Theofanous, Greek-Cypriot composer and producer
1970 – Lara Fabian, Belgian-Italian singer-songwriter and actress
1971 – Angie Martinez, American rapper, actress, and radio host
1973 – Sean Paul, Jamaican rapper, singer-songwriter, musician, record producer, and actor
1974 – Omari Hardwick, American actor
1975 – James Beckford, Jamaican long jumper
1976 – Radek Bonk, Czech ice hockey player
1978 – Mathieu Garon, Canadian ice hockey player
  1978   – Gennaro Gattuso, Italian footballer and manager
  1978   – Chad Johnson, American football player
  1978   – AJ McLean, American singer, dancer, and actor
1980 – Édgar Álvarez, Honduran footballer
  1980   – Sergio García, Spanish golfer
  1980   – Luke Patten, Australian rugby league player and referee
  1980   – Francisco Pavón, Spanish footballer
1981 – Euzebiusz Smolarek, Polish footballer and manager
1982 – Catherine, Princess of Wales
1985 – Juan Francisco Torres, Spanish footballer
1986 – Jéferson Gomes, Brazilian footballer
  1986   – Amanda Mynhardt, South African netball player
1987 – Lucas Leiva, Brazilian footballer
  1987   – Paolo Nutini, Scottish singer-songwriter and guitarist
  1987   – Jami Puustinen, Finnish footballer
1988 – Lee Yeon-hee, South Korean actress
1989 – Michael Beasley, American basketball player
  1989   – Nina Dobrev, Bulgarian-Canadian actress
  1989   – Yana Maksimava, Belarusian heptathlete
  1989   – Chris Sandow, Australian rugby league player
  1989   – Haris Sohail, Pakistani cricketer
1991 – Álvaro Soler, Spanish singer-songwriter
1992 – Joseph Parker, Samoan heavyweight boxer
1993 – Katarina Johnson-Thompson, English long jumper and heptathlete
1995 – Braden Hamlin-Uele, New Zealand rugby league player
  1995   – Nicola Peltz, American actress
1998 – Brent Rivera, American social media personality and actor
2001 – Peter Mamouzelos, Australian rugby league player
2004 – Souhardya De, Indian author and columnist

Deaths

Pre-1600
 710 – Adrian of Canterbury, abbot and scholar
1150 – Emperor Xizong of Jin (b. 1119)
1282 – Abû 'Uthmân Sa'îd ibn Hakam al Qurashi, Minorcan ruler (b. 1204)
1283 – Wen Tianxiang, Chinese general and scholar (b. 1236)
1367 – Giulia della Rena, Italian saint (b. 1319)
1450 – Adam Moleyns, Bishop of Chichester
1463 – William Neville, 1st Earl of Kent, English soldier (b. 1405)
1499 – John Cicero, Elector of Brandenburg (b. 1455)
1511 – Demetrios Chalkokondyles, Greek scholar and academic (b. 1423)
1514 – Anne of Brittany, queen of Charles VIII of France and Louis XII of France (b. 1477)
1529 – Wang Yangming, Chinese Neo-Confucian scholar (b. 1472)
1534 – Johannes Aventinus, Bavarian historian and philologist (b. 1477)
1543 – Guillaume du Bellay, French general and diplomat (b. 1491)
1561 – Amago Haruhisa, Japanese warlord (b. 1514)
1571 – Nicolas Durand de Villegaignon, French admiral (b. 1510)
1598 – Jasper Heywood, English poet and scholar (b. 1553)

1601–1900
1612 – Leonard Holliday, Lord Mayor of London (b. 1550)
1622 – Alix Le Clerc, French Canoness Regular and foundress (b. 1576)
1757 – Bernard Le Bovier de Fontenelle, French author, poet, and playwright (b. 1657)
1762 – Antonio de Benavides, colonial governor of Florida (b. 1678)
1766 – Thomas Birch, English historian and author (b. 1705)
1799 – Maria Gaetana Agnesi, Italian mathematician and philosopher (b. 1718)
1800 – Jean Étienne Championnet, French general (b. 1762)
1805 – Noble Wimberly Jones, American physician and politician (b. 1723)
1833 – Adrien-Marie Legendre, French mathematician and theorist (b. 1752)*1843 – William Hedley, English engineer (b. 1773)
1848 – Caroline Herschel, German-English astronomer (b. 1750)
1856 – Neophytos Vamvas, Greek cleric and educator (b. 1770)
1858 – Anson Jones, American physician and politician; 4th President of the Republic of Texas (b. 1798)
1873 – Napoleon III, French politician, 1st President of France (b. 1808)
1876 – Samuel Gridley Howe, American physician and activist (b. 1801)
1878 – Victor Emmanuel II of Italy (b. 1820)
1895 – Aaron Lufkin Dennison, American-English businessman (b. 1812)

1901–present
1901 – Richard Copley Christie, English lawyer and academic (b. 1830)
1908 – Wilhelm Busch, German poet, illustrator, and painter (b. 1832)
  1908   – Abraham Goldfaden, Russian actor, playwright, and author (b. 1840)
1911 – Edwin Arthur Jones, American violinist and composer (b. 1853)
  1911   – Edvard Rusjan, Italian-Slovene pilot and engineer (b. 1886)
1917 – Luther D. Bradley, American cartoonist (b. 1853)
1918 – Charles-Émile Reynaud, French scientist and educator, invented the Praxinoscope (b. 1844)
1923 – Katherine Mansfield, New Zealand novelist, short story writer, and essayist (b. 1888)
1924 – Ponnambalam Arunachalam, Sri Lankan civil servant and politician (b. 1853)
1927 – Houston Stewart Chamberlain, English-German philosopher and author (b. 1855)
1930 – Edward Bok, Dutch-American journalist and author (b. 1863)
1931 – Wayne Munn, American football player and wrestler (b. 1896)
1936 – John Gilbert, American actor, director, and screenwriter (b. 1899)
1939 – Johann Strauss III, Austrian violinist, composer, and conductor (b. 1866)
1941 – Dimitrios Golemis, Greek runner (b. 1874)
1945 – Shigekazu Shimazaki, Japanese admiral and pilot (b. 1908)
  1945   – Jüri Uluots, Estonian journalist and politician, 7th Prime Minister of Estonia (b. 1890)
  1945   – Osman Cemal Kaygılı, Turkish journalist, author, and playwright (b. 1890)
1946 – Countee Cullen, American poet and playwright (b. 1903)
1947 – Karl Mannheim, Hungarian-English sociologist and academic (b. 1893)
1960 – Elsie J. Oxenham, English author and educator (b. 1880)
1961 – Emily Greene Balch, American economist and academic, Nobel Prize laureate (b. 1867)
1964 – Halide Edib Adıvar, Turkish author and academic (b. 1884)
1971 – Elmer Flick, American baseball player and scout (b. 1876)
1972 – Ted Shawn, American dancer and choreographer (b. 1891)
1975 – Pierre Fresnay, French actor and screenwriter (b. 1897)
  1975   – Pyotr Novikov, Russian mathematician and theorist (b. 1901)
1979 – Pier Luigi Nervi, Italian engineer and architect, designed the Tour de la Bourse and Pirelli Tower (b. 1891)
1981 – Kazimierz Serocki, Polish pianist and composer (b. 1922)
1984 – Bob Dyer, American-Australian radio and television host (b. 1909)
1985 – Robert Mayer, German-English businessman and philanthropist (b. 1879)
1987 – Arthur Lake, American actor (b. 1905)
1988 – Peter L. Rypdal, Norwegian fiddler and composer (b. 1909)
1990 – Spud Chandler, American baseball player, coach, and manager (b. 1907)
  1990   – Cemal Süreya, Turkish poet and journalist (b. 1931)
1992 – Steve Brodie, American actor (b. 1919)
  1992   – Bill Naughton, English playwright and screenwriter (b. 1910)
1993 – Paul Hasluck, Australian historian and politician, Governor-General of Australia (b. 1905)
1995 – Souphanouvong, Laotian politician, 1st President of Laos (b. 1909)
  1995   – Peter Cook, English actor and screenwriter (b. 1937)
1996 – Walter M. Miller, Jr., American soldier and author (b. 1923)
  1996   – Abdullah al-Qasemi, Saudi atheist, writer, and intellectual (b. 1907)
1997 – Edward Osóbka-Morawski, Polish politician, Prime Minister of Poland (b. 1909)
  1997   – Jesse White, American actor (b. 1917)
1998 – Kenichi Fukui, Japanese chemist and academic, Nobel Prize laureate (b. 1918)
  1998   – Imi Lichtenfeld, Slovakian-Israeli martial artist, founded Krav Maga (b. 1910)
2000 – Arnold Alexander Hall, English engineer and academic (b. 1915)
  2000   – Nigel Tranter, Scottish historian and author (b. 1909)
2001 – Maurice Prather, American photographer and director (b. 1926)
2003 – Will McDonough, American journalist (b. 1935)
2004 – Norberto Bobbio, Italian philosopher and academic (b. 1909)
2006 – Andy Caldecott, Australian motorcycle racer (b. 1964)
  2006   – W. Cleon Skousen, American author and academic (b. 1913)
2007 – Elmer Symons, South African motorcycle racer (b. 1977)
  2007   – Jean-Pierre Vernant, French anthropologist and historian (b. 1914)
2008 – Johnny Grant, American radio host and producer (b. 1923)
  2008   – John Harvey-Jones, English businessman and television host (b. 1924)
2009 – Rob Gauntlett, English mountaineer and explorer (b. 1987)
  2009   – T. Llew Jones, Welsh author and poet (b. 1914)
  2009   – Tan Chor Jin, Singaporean murderer and triad leader of Ang Soon Tong (b. 1966)
2011 – Makinti Napanangka, Australian painter (b. 1930)
2012 – Brian Curvis, Welsh boxer (b. 1937)
  2012   – Augusto Gansser-Biaggi, Swiss geologist and academic (b. 1910)
  2012   – William G. Roll, German-American psychologist and parapsychologist (b. 1926)
  2012   – Malam Bacai Sanhá, Guinea-Bissau politician, President of Guinea-Bissau (b. 1947)
  2012   – László Szekeres, Hungarian physician and academic (b. 1921)
2013 – Brigitte Askonas, Austrian-English immunologist and academic (b. 1923)
  2013   – James M. Buchanan, American economist and academic, Nobel Prize laureate (b. 1919)
  2013   – Robert L. Rock, American businessman and politician, 42nd Lieutenant Governor of Indiana (b. 1927)
  2013   – John Wise, Canadian farmer and politician, 23rd Canadian Minister of Agriculture (b. 1935)
2014 – Amiri Baraka, American poet, playwright, and academic (b. 1934)
  2014   – Josep Maria Castellet, Spanish poet and critic (b. 1926)
  2014   – Paul du Toit, South African painter and sculptor (b. 1965)
  2014   – Dale T. Mortensen, American economist and academic, Nobel Prize laureate (b. 1939)
2015 – Michel Jeury, French author (b. 1934)
  2015   – Józef Oleksy, Polish economist and politician, 7th Prime Minister of Poland (b. 1946)
  2015   – Abdul Rahman Ya'kub, Malaysian politician, 3rd Chief Minister of Sarawak (b. 1928) 
  2015   – Roy Tarpley, American basketball player (b. 1964)
2016 – John Harvard, Canadian journalist and politician, 23rd Lieutenant Governor of Manitoba (b. 1938)
  2016   – Angus Scrimm, American actor and author (b. 1926)
2017 – Zygmunt Bauman, Polish sociologist (b. 1925) 
2018 – Kato Ottio, Papua New Guinean rugby league player (b. 1994)
2019 – Verna Bloom, American actress (b. 1938)
  2019   – Paul Koslo, German-Canadian actor (b. 1944)
2021 – John Reilly, American actor (b. 1934)
2022 – Bob Saget, American comedian, actor, and television host (b. 1956)
2022 - Maria Ewing, American opera singer (b.1950)
  2023   – Séamus Begley, Irish accordion player, fiddler and Irish traditional musician (b. 1949)

Holidays and observances
 Christian feast day:
 Adrian of Canterbury
 Berhtwald
Translation of the Black Nazarene (Manila, Philippines)
 Philip II, Metropolitan of Moscow
 Julia Chester Emery (Episcopal Church (USA))
Stephen (old calendar Eastern Orthodox)
 January 9 (Eastern Orthodox liturgics)
Start of Hōonkō (Nishi Honganji) January 9–16 (Jōdo Shinshū Buddhism)
 Martyrs' Day (Panama)
 Non-Resident Indian Day (India)
 Day of Republika Srpska (Republika Srpska entity of Bosnia and Herzegovina, result of 2016 Republika Srpska National Day referendum) (note: not celebrated and disputed in wider Bosnia and Herzegovina, having been declared unconstitutional in 2015)

References

External links

 BBC: On This Day
 
 Historical Events on January 9

Days of the year
January